The Body of Christ and the Legs of Tina Turner is the second album released by Irish band Fight Like Apes. It was released on 27 August 2010 in the Republic of Ireland as the follow-up to their debut album Fight Like Apes and the Mystery of the Golden Medallion.

Background and recording
Pockets came up with the title. The album was recorded between touring. The album has been largely recorded in Dublin and London. The album has been produced by Andy Gill, the guitarist from Gang of Four who has worked with Futureheads, Red Hot Chili Peppers and Polysics. The Body of Christ and the Legs of Tina Turner was available for download in the United States on 25 April 2011.

Track listing

Charts

Singles
The first single from the album is "Hoo Ha Henry". The single was available to download from 20 August 2010.

References

2010 albums
Fight Like Apes albums
Rubyworks Records albums
Albums produced by Andy Gill